The Dora Mavor Moore Award for Outstanding Performance by a Male in a Principal Role - Musical is an annual award celebrating achievements in live Canadian theatre.

Awards and nominations

References

External links
 Toronto Alliance for the Performing Arts - Doras

Dora Mavor Moore Awards
Theatre acting awards
Awards for male actors
Musical theatre awards